The 1988 Nutri-Metics Open was a women's tennis tournament played on outdoor hard courts at the ASB Tennis Centre in Auckland in New Zealand and was part of the Category 1 tier of the 1988 Virginia Slims World Championship Series. It was the third edition of the tournament and ran from 25 January until 31 January 1988. Patty Fendick won the singles title.

Finals

Singles

 Patty Fendick defeated  Sara Gomer 6–3, 7–6(7–3)
 It was Fendick's 1st title of the year and the 1st of her career.

Doubles

 Patty Fendick /  Jill Hetherington defeated  Cammy MacGregor /  Cynthia MacGregor 6–2, 6–1
 It was Fendick's 2nd title of the year and the 2nd of her career. It was Hetherington's 1st title of the year and the 2nd of her career.

See also
 1988 Benson and Hedges Open – men's tournament

References

External links
 Official website
 ITF tournament edition details
 Tournament draws

Nutri-Metics Open
WTA Auckland Open
Ten
Ten
ASB